Afşin is a town and district of Kahramanmaraş Province in the Mediterranean region of Turkey.

Afşin-Elbistan power stations 

Two coal fired power stations are operational and are said to be damaging health via air pollution.

See also
Arabissus

References

External links

 District governor's official website 
 District municipality's official website 

Populated places in Kahramanmaraş Province
Districts of Kahramanmaraş Province
Afşin (district)
Towns in Turkey